Philippe Collas or Philippe Collas-Villedary  (born in France) is a French writer and scriptwriter who is famous for his historical and criminal thrillers.
As the great-grandson of Pierre Bouchardon, the man who arrested Mata Hari, his biography about her is considered a notable reference.

Awards
1989: "Lauréat de la Villa Médicis Hors-Les Murs" for his work on King Ludwig II of Bavaria.
1991: "Prix Anne Philipe", named after the widow of the famous French actor, Gérard Philipe, an award for the most talented young theatrical writer.

Works
Louis II et Elisabeth d'Autriche, Âmes soeurs, (Le Rocher, Paris/Monaco 2001)
Maurice Dekobra, Gentleman entre deux mondes (Séguier, Paris 2002)
Edith Wharton's French Riviera, with Éric Villedary (Flammarion, Paris 2002; Rizzoli New-York 2002)
Mata Hari, Sa Véritable Histoire, (Plon, Paris) 2003, (Piper Verlag, Munich 2009)
Jean de La Fontaine, Détective (four opus) (Plon, Paris 2004/2007)
Mata Hari, La dernière danse de l'espionne. (French Pulp 2017).
L'Île du Lundi, with Éric Villedary, (French Pulp 2018)
etc

References

External links

People from Thionville
1957 births
Living people
20th-century French novelists
20th-century French male writers
21st-century French novelists
French male novelists
French biographers
Sciences Po alumni
21st-century French male writers
French male non-fiction writers
Male biographers